= F. H. Tonkin =

American politician from Washington

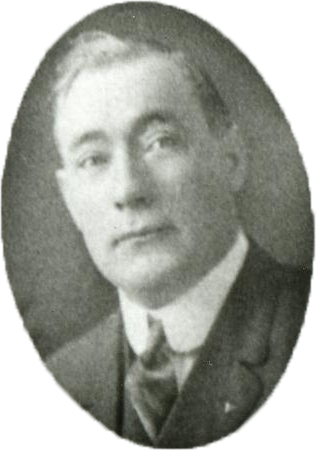
- Tonkin in 1913

Member of the Washington House of Representatives for the 40th district
- In office 1907–1917

Personal details
- Born: March 31, 1875 At sea
- Died: May 20, 1938 (aged 63) Seattle, Washington, United States
- Party: Republican

Frederick Harry Tonkin (March 31, 1875 – May 20, 1938) was an American politician in the state of Washington. He served in the Washington House of Representatives from 1917 to 1933.
